The 1978 Broxbourne Council election was held to elect council members of the Broxbourne Borough Council, the local government authority of the borough of Broxbourne, Hertfordshire, England.

Composition of expiring seats before election

Election results

Results summary 

An election was held in 14 wards on 4 May 1978.

14 seats were contested at this election.

The Conservative Party made 2 gains winning Rosedale Ward from Labour and retaking Goffs Oak Ward from Councillor D T Hickman who had left the Conservative Group shortly after the 1976 election to sit as an Independent.

This was the first Broxbourne Election to see National Front candidates, who stood in 4 wards.

The new political balance of the council following this election was:

Conservative 37 seats
Labour 5 seats

Ward results

References
Lea Valley Mercury Friday 12 May 1978 Edition

1978
1978 English local elections
1970s in Hertfordshire